Nicholas Owen McRoberts (born 16 January 1977) is an Australian composer and conductor of classical music. He studied music in Australia, before moving to Paris, France where he lives today.

His Symphony No. 1 “From the Old World” was premiered by the Sofia Philharmonic on the 27th of August 2022 with the composer conducting.

His "Adagio for Strings" was commissioned for the Nürtinger Chamber Orchestra and first performed on November 14, 2021, conducted by Friederike Kienle. It was written during the Covid lockdowns and recorded with the Janaček Philharmonic in March 2021. The French première was given by the Ensemble Orchestral de Biarritz, conducted by Yves Bouillier in July 2022.

In September 2019 he was named conductor of the Orchestre Démos du Grand Verdun  with the Philharmonie de Paris.

In 2018 he was named artistic director of Opéra Montmartre in Paris.

In 2017 he collaborated with the French choreographer Nawel Oulad on a ballet Les Tisseuses de Silence and a duo Femme au Piano for the Semaine de la Danse in Paris which were performed in the Festival Les Aliennes and the Festival Appel de la Lune.

His Violin Concerto was recorded in 2017 with the Janáček Philharmonic Orchestra.

His operas include "Lyon" (2016) premiered by the Ruse State Opera in July 2016, and "Nera" (2017) adapted from the play "Devojka Modre Kose" (The Girl with the Midnight Blue Hair) written by the Serbian playwright Vida Ognjenović.

His composition "Festival Fanfare" was the recipient of the 2002 OpenBook Award for Sacred Music.

His works are published by Halcyon Publications in Paris.

Biography 
Nicholas McRoberts was born in Melbourne in 1977 and grew up in Ballarat. He studied piano with Anna Jurkewicz and Bruce Keck while a student at Ballarat and Clarendon College. He went on to study piano and composition at the Melbourne Conservatorium, the Victorian College of the Arts and the Australian National Academy of Music. While tutoring at Trinity College, Melbourne, he founded the Trinity College Chamber Orchestra. He studied conducting with Robert Rosen, Jorma Panula and Dejan Savić. After moving to France, he continued studies at the Conservatoire de Paris (CNSMDP) under János Fürst and at the Ecole Normale (Conservatoire Cortot).

List of works

Operas 
 Merlin (2020-)
 Nera (2017–2019)
 Lyon (1996–2016)

Orchestral 
 Symphony No.2 in G minor (2021-)
 Symphony No.1 in B minor (1999-2020)
 Violin Concerto (2016)
 The Traveller Orchestral Suite  (1995-)

Chamber 

 Adagio for Strings (2020-2021)
 Diesque (1998)

Ballet 
 Même les rêves ont peur de mourir (2018)
 Les Tisseuses de Silence (2017)
 A Fairy Tale Begins (1998-)

Piano 
 Cinq Nocturnes (2020)
 8 Préludes (2000)
 Five Nocturnes (1998)
 Serenade (2000)

Vocal 
 Wild Nights - Dickinson Cycle (2018)
 Do Not Go Gentle (2002)
 French Songs (1995)
 Valediction Forbidding Mourning (1995)
 Keats Cycle (1993-2006)

Organ 
 Festival Fanfare (1997)

References

External links 
 www.nicholasmcroberts.com
 www.operalyon.com
 TEDx BeauSoleil

1977 births
Living people
Australian conductors (music)
Australian classical composers
21st-century conductors (music)